Heterobranchia, the heterobranchs (meaning "different-gilled snails"), is a taxonomic clade of snails and slugs, which includes marine, aquatic and terrestrial gastropod mollusks.

Heterobranchia is one of the main clades of gastropods. Currently Heterobranchia comprises three informal groups: the lower heterobranchs, the opisthobranchs and the pulmonates.

Diversity 
The three subdivisions of this large clade are quite diverse:

 The Lower Heterobranchia includes shelled marine and freshwater species.
 Opisthobranchia are almost all marine species, some shelled and some not. The internal organs of the opisthobranchs have undergone detorsion (unwinding of the viscera that were twisted during torsion).
 The Pulmonata includes the majority of land snails and slugs, many freshwater snails, and a small number of marine species. The mantle cavity of the Pulmonata is modified into an air-breathing organ. They are also characterized by detorsion and a symmetrically-arranged nervous system. The pulmonates almost always lack an operculum and are hermaphroditic.

Taxonomy

Older taxonomy 
The families currently included in Heterobranchia have historically been placed in many different parts of the taxonomic class of gastropods. Earlier authors (such as J.E. Gray, 1840) considered Heterobranchia to consist of only marine gastropods, and conceptualized it as a borderline category, intermediate between the Opisthobranchia & Pulmonata, and all the other gastropods.

The (sometimes recognized) category Heterostropha within the Heterobranchia, which includes such families as Architectonicidae, the sundial or staircase snails, is primarily characterized by a shell which has a heterostrophic protoconch, in other words the apical whorls are coiled in the opposite plane to the adult whorls. The classification of this group was revised by Ponder & Warén in 1988.

According to the  older taxonomy of the Gastropoda (Ponder & Lindberg, 1997) the Heterobranchia were ranked as a superorder.

2005 taxonomy 

Heterobranchia is currently one of the main clades of gastropods. For a detailed taxonomy, see Taxonomy of the Gastropoda (Bouchet & Rocroi, 2005)#Clade Heterobranchia.

2010 taxonomy 
Jörger et al. (2010) have redefined major groups within the Heterobranchia: they created the new clades Euopisthobranchia and Panpulmonata.

A cladogram showing phylogenic relations of Heterobranchia as proposed by Jörger et al. (2010):

References

Further reading 
 Dinapoli A. (2009). Phylogeny and Evolution of the Heterobranchia (Mollusca, Gastropoda). Thesis, Frankfurt am Main, 176 pp. PDF.
 

 
Gastropod taxonomy
Protostome unranked clades
Taxa named by John Edward Gray